Anthony Quinlan is an English actor, known for his roles as Gilly Roach in the Channel 4 soap opera Hollyoaks and Pete Barton in the ITV soap opera Emmerdale.

Career
Quinlan played Gilly Roach in the English Channel 4 soap opera Hollyoaks. He was nominated for "Sexiest Male" at the 2010 Inside Soap Awards. He was nominated in the category of "Best Serial Drama Performance" at the 2011 National Television Awards; that same year, he was also nominated in the category of "Best Actor" at the British Soap Awards.

On 5 November 2013, it was announced that Quinlan had joined the cast of Emmerdale as Pete Barton. On 30 November 2019, Quinlan quit the soap and left in 2020.

Filmography

Awards and nominations

References

External links
 

1984 births
English male soap opera actors
English people of Irish descent
Living people
Male actors from Salford
21st-century English male actors